The 2007–08 Russian Cup was the sixteenth season of the Russian football knockout tournament since the dissolution of Soviet Union. The competition started on 18 April 2007 and finished with the final held on 17 May 2008.

First round
This round featured four Second Division teams and four amateur teams. The games were played on 18 April 2007.

Section West

Section Center

Second round
In this round entered 4 winners from the First Round and the 60 Second Division teams. The matches were played from April 15 to April 29, 2007.

Section West

Section South

Section East

Section Center

Section Ural-Povolzhye

Third round
In this round entered 32 winners from the Second Round and the 8 remaining Second Division teams. The matches were played from April 29 to May 14, 2007.

Section West

Section Center

Section East

Section South

Section Ural-Povolzhye

Fourth round
In this round entered 20 winners from the Third Round teams. The matches were played from May 18 to June 2, 2007.

Section West

Section Center

Section East

Section South

Section Ural-Povolzhye

Fifth round
In this round entered 10 winners from the Fourth Round teams and the 22 First Division teams. The matches were played on 12 and 13 June 2007.

|}

Round of 32
In this round entered 16 winners from the Fifth Round teams and the all Premier League teams. The matches were played on June 27, 2007.

Round of 16
The matches were played on August 8, 2007.

Quarter-finals
The matches were played on 16 September and 31 October 2007.

Semi-finals
The matches were played on April 16, 2008.

Final
The match was played on 17 May 2008.

Played in the earlier stages, but were not on the final game squad:

PFC CSKA Moscow: Veniamin Mandrykin (GK),  Daniel Carvalho (MF),  Eduardo Ratinho (MF),  Caner Erkin (MF), Sergei Gorelov (MF), Rolan Gusev (MF), Ivan Taranov (MF), Dmitry Tikhonov (FW), Nikita Burmistrov (FW).

FC Sibir Novosibirsk: Ivan Levenets (GK), Pavel Alikin (DF),  Ghenadie Olexici (DF), Vitali Grishin (MF),  Andrei Lavrik (MF), Mikhail Makagonov (MF), Andrei Kobenko (MF),  Antonio Soldevilla (MF), Sergei Volkov (FW),  Yevgeny Savin (FW).

Russian Cup seasons
Russian Cup
Cup
Cup